Members of the New South Wales Legislative Assembly who served in the 24th parliament of New South Wales held their seats from 1917 to 1920. They were elected at the 1917 state election on 24 March 1917. Speaker was John Cohen until 19 August 1919 when he was succeeded by Daniel Levy.

See also
Second Holman ministry
Results of the 1917 New South Wales state election
Candidates of the 1917 New South Wales state election

References

Members of New South Wales parliaments by term
20th-century Australian politicians